The , also commonly known as the Circle Route, is a route of the Fukuoka Expressway system serving Fukuoka–Kitakyushu. The route runs through the city of Fukuoka and it is displayed as a "ring road" on information signs. Although it was once referred to as the city high ring road, it is now generally dubbed as the "ring road".

History
The expressway was built between 1983 and 2012.

References

Ring roads in Japan
Roads in Fukuoka Prefecture